On the Sunny Side may refer to:

On the Sunny Side (1942 film), a drama directed by Harold D. Schuster
On the Sunny Side (1961 film), an East German musical comedy film
On the Sunny Side (The Four Lads album), 1956
On the Sunny Side (Paul Quinichette album), 1957

See also
"Keep On the Sunny Side", an 1899 song
"On the Sunny Side of the Street", a 1930 song
On the Sunny Side of the Strip, a 1960 album by the George Shearing quintet
Sunny Side of the Street (disambiguation)